, the late-night live variety series Saturday Night Live (SNL) has featured 163 cast members. The ensemble was originally referred to as the "Not Ready for Prime Time Players".

Complete list
The list below includes both repertory and featured players past and present, but omits SNL writers and others who were not listed as cast members during the show's credits. The dates given are those of the years they were part of the cast. The chart also shows whether the cast member has served as a guest host, appeared as the anchorperson of the "Weekend Update" segment (by any of its titles), or has been the subject of their own "Best of" home video collection. Many of the cast members were writers as well. "Middle group" performers are introduced after the main cast by the announcer saying "...with" and reading off these performers before ending with featured players.

Sid Caesar has the distinction of being the only person who has been named an honorary cast member. Caesar was presented with a plaque during the goodnights of his hosting stint in 1983.

Table

Timeline
Lighter colors denote "featured players" versus repertory cast members.

Tenures

Longest tenures

Shortest tenures
Two people have been publicly announced as having been hired to the cast, but never performed as cast members:

Catherine O'Hara, hired in 1981 but quit before ever appearing on air. She has subsequently hosted the show twice.
Shane Gillis was announced as a cast member in 2019, but the offer was withdrawn due to controversies surrounding his past use of racial slurs. 

One person was credited as a cast member but did not actually appear on the show as such.
Emily Prager was hired as part of Ebersol's temporary season six cast following the termination of Jean Doumanian. She was credited for one episode even though she did not appear on the show, as her skit was cut after dress rehearsal. She was not chosen for season seven of the show. Prager had worked as a writer on the show, and also made several appearances in skits prior to being officially named as a member of the cast.

The following cast members spent less than a full 20-episode season on the show.

President of the United States impressionists

Portraying the sitting President of the United States is considered "about as high [...] an honor that can be bestowed upon a cast member."

Darrell Hammond had the longest tenure portraying a U.S. president, portraying Bill Clinton from 1995–2001 and George W. Bush during 2003. He, Joe Piscopo, and Phil Hartman are the only cast members to have portrayed two sitting presidents. 

George H. W. Bush grew fond of Dana Carvey's impersonation of him. Carvey was invited to headline a White House Christmas party in 1992, during the lame duck period after Bush had lost the election. Two years later, on October 22, 1994, when Carvey hosted the show for the first time, Bush appeared in pre-recorded videos, in both the cold open and the opening monologue, critiquing Carvey's impersonation of him.

Presidents are not usually portrayed on Saturday Night Live after they leave office. Exceptions are limited to the portrayal of former president Richard Nixon who left office prior to the launch of the show in 1975, Bill Clinton who appeared in sketches related to the presidential campaigns of his wife Hillary Clinton, and Donald Trump who continued to be politically active after leaving office. Dan Aykroyd portrayed Nixon from 1975–79, and Darrell Hammond portrayed Nixon on episode 12 of season 34. James Austin Johnson portrayed Trump in several episodes of season 47.

Impersonation of Donald Trump

Donald Trump, having been a public figure before being president, was portrayed by several cast members over the years. He was portrayed by Phil Hartman (1988–1990), Darrell Hammond (1999–2011, 2015–2016), Jason Sudeikis (2012) and Taran Killam (2015). Alec Baldwin started impersonating Trump as a guest during the 42nd season of SNL in late 2016, when Trump was the Republican nominee during the 2016 United States presidential elections. Baldwin continued with the guest impersonations of Trump after the elections when Trump was president-elect, as well as after Trump was sworn in as president. Baldwin continued to impersonate Trump throughout Trump's presidency.

Alec Baldwin's impersonation of Donald Trump earned him an Emmy award in 2017, in spite of his public declaration that he "loathes the role." At the end of Season 44, Baldwin publicly announced that he will cease impersonating Trump, but  changed his mind prior to the beginning of Season 45 after SNL executive producer Lorne Michaels convinced him to continue with the impersonation.  Following the 2020 presidential elections in which Trump lost re-election, Baldwin tweeted "I don't believe I've ever been this overjoyed to lose a job before!"

Trump has criticized Baldwin's portrayal on multiple occasions. In response, Baldwin taunted Trump with statements such as "release your tax returns and I'll stop." In June 2021, after Trump had left office, it was reported that while Trump was in office he had inquired if the Federal Communications Commission or the United States Justice Department could force SNL to stop portraying him. Trump denied that he has ever made such an inquiry, but claimed that his portrayal by SNL "should be considered an illegal campaign contribution from the Democrat Party." He also criticized Baldwin's portrayal of him, but praised Darrell Hammond's portrayal of him.

Returning to host
Several former SNL cast members have returned to host the show. The first former cast member to come back and host the show was Chevy Chase in February 1978. While the majority of cast members who also hosted the show were first cast members and then hosted after leaving the show, there have been two cast members who have hosted the show prior to joining the cast: Billy Crystal (he hosted the show twice during the ninth season prior to joining the cast in the tenth season) and Michael McKean (he hosted the show in the tenth season and joined the cast in the nineteenth season). McKean is also the only eventual cast member who first appeared as a musical guest (with Spinal Tap, May 1984).

Eddie Murphy is the only cast member to have hosted the show while still a cast member. He also holds the distinction of having the longest gap between successive hosting of the show. There was a 35 year and 6 day gap between his second and third hosting of the show.

Adam Sandler and Dan Aykroyd tie the record of the longest gap between leaving the show as a cast member and returning as a host. Both hosted the show for the first time nine days shy of 24 years from last appearance as cast. However, both made appearances on the show during the gap. On the flip side, Bill Murray holds the record for having the shortest gap between leaving the show and returning to host at 287 days after leaving the cast.

The "SNL Curse"
Although SNL is best known as the launchpad for many successful careers, eight former cast members have died before the age of 60. This has given rise to a superstition known as the "Saturday Night Live Curse".

See also 

 Saturday Night Live Band
 List of Saturday Night Live guests
 List of Saturday Night Live writers

Notes

References

Bibliography

External links 
 A visual history from The New York Times
 A 2015 ranking from Rolling Stone

Cast
Lists of comedians